Dhauli or Dhauligiri is a hill located on the banks of the river Daya, 8 km south of Bhubaneswar in Odisha, India.

Significance 
Dhauli known for "Dhauli Santi Stupa", a peace pagoda monument which witnesses the great Kalinga War built by Japan Budhha Sangha and Kalinga Nippon Budhha Sangha.

Dhauli hill is presumed to be the area where the Kalinga War was fought.

Images

References

External links

Photos of Dhauli (Flickr)

Buddhist art
History of Odisha
Stupas in India
Buddha statues in India
Tourist attractions in Bhubaneswar
Archaeological sites in Odisha
Archaeological monuments in Odisha
Buddhist sites in Odisha